Aldino Muianga (born 1 May 1950) is a Mozambican physician and writer.

Career
Muianga was born in Lourenço Marques. He studied surgery and he is the national coordinator of Mozambican Community Work. He is presently a professor in the field of medicine in the University of Pretoria, South Africa.

Personal life
He is married to Carolina Teresa de Sousa. They have 3 children: Hugo Miguel Muianga, Aldino Frederico de Sousa Muianga, and Mick Ivan de Sousa Muianga.

Awards
Prémio Literário TDM, 2001
Prémio Literário Da Vinci, 2003
Prémio José Craveirinha de Literatura, 2009.

Works
Xitala Mati, (1987)
Magustana, (1992)
A Noiva de Kebera, (1999);
Rosa Xintimana, (2001); (Prémio Literário TDM)
O Domador de Burros, (2003); (Prémio Literário Da Vinci)
Meledina ou história de uma prostituta,(2004)
A Metamorfose, (2005)
Contos Rústicos, (2007)
 Contravenção – uma história de amor em tempo de guerra, (2008), Prémio José Craveirinha de Literatura

References

1950 births
People from Maputo
Living people
Mozambican writers
Mozambican surgeons